Sébastien Pan (born 9 July 1984) is a French composer and musician, best known for his work on motion picture and animated TV series. He's a permanent resident of New Zealand since 2015.

Biography 
Born in Montbéliard, France, Sébastien Pan gained experience writing music for motion pictures, animated TV series and TV commercials at Imaginex Studios, an international award-winning audio post-production house.

Besides writing for live action movies and TV series, Sebastien began his collaboration with the director Wang YunFei in scoring the animation movie "Yugo & Lala" (aka Ava & Lala) in 2012, followed by "Yugo & Lala 2" in 2014 and "Kwai Boo, Crazy space adventure" in 2015. "Kwai Boo" marks the first time a Chinese animation project has received investment from a Hollywood giant, in this case 20th Century Fox.

He is a member of the high IQ society Mensa International, his IQ being "135 or higher" on the Wechsler scale (which translates to 156 or higher on the Cattell scale).

Filmography

Film

Television

TV commercials
Pan also scored more than 60 international TV commercials and worked with renowned advertising agencies such as Saatchi and Saatchi, Leo Burnett Worldwide, DDB, [The Agency (company)|the Agency]...

Book Soundtrack
In 2013, he wrote a 52-minute symphonic piece based on the fantasy novel "Autre Monde – L'Alliance des Trois" written by the best selling French author Maxime Chattam.

References

External links
 
 Official website

1984 births
Living people
People from Montbéliard
French composers